Anton Kramarenko (born January 27, 1984) is a Kyrgyz former swimmer, who specialized in breaststroke events. Kramarenko qualified for the men's 200 m breaststroke at the 2004 Summer Olympics in Athens, by clearing a FINA B-cut of 2:20.57 from the Kazakhstan Open Championships in Almaty. He challenged six other swimmers in heat one, including two-time Olympian Malick Fall of Senegal. He rounded out the field to last place in 2:28.59, nearly 10 seconds behind winner Bradley Ally of Barbados. Kramarenko failed to advance into the semifinals, as he placed forty-sixth overall in the preliminaries.

References

External links
 

1984 births
Living people
Sportspeople from Bishkek
Kyrgyzstani people of Ukrainian descent
Kyrgyzstani male breaststroke swimmers
Olympic swimmers of Kyrgyzstan
Swimmers at the 2004 Summer Olympics